Jeannette van Zutphen (10 December 1949, in Utrecht – 25 April 2005) was a Dutch singer.

Discography 
1965: M'n moeder is jarig – Decca AT 10130
M'n moeder is jarig
Laat ons vrienden zijn
1965: Ik heb 'n wonder gezien – Decca AT 10167
Ik heb 'n wonder gezien
Kijk naar de sterren
1966: Michel – Decca AT 10190
Michel (Michelle)
Stoplicht-idylle
1966: Je naam uit mijn hart – Decca AT 10217
Je naam uit mijn hart
Blauw, blauw, blauw
1967: Cupidootje – Decca AT 10254
Cupidootje
Waarom kan ik jou niet vergeten
1968: Lugano – Decca AT 10300
Lugano
Hopla
1968: Ik weet waarom – Decca AT 10334
Ik weet waarom
Nee zei m'n vader, ja zei mama
1970: Elke dag – CNR 141.108
Elke dag
De laatste dag (Vreemdeling)
1971: Alexander – CNR – 141.142
Alexander
Bruidsklokken
1973: Very good, c'est si bon – CNR – 141.219
Very good, c'est si bon
Kom terug
1974: Wie weet waar ik hem kan vinden – Telstar TS 1998
Wie weet waar ik hem kan vinden
Bonjour mon amour
1974: M'n hart is als een bloementuin – Telstar TS 2044
M'n hart is als een bloementuin
Zeg hem toch niet dat ik...
1975: Een leven zonder jou – Telstar TS 2186
Een leven zonder jou
Ja en dan
1971: De leukste liedjes uit Oebele – CNR – 544.322
B2. De poort van Oebele
B4. Oe van Oebele
1971: 16 Toppers deel 2 – CNR – 241.360
A7. Waarheen, waarvoor

References

1949 births
2005 deaths
20th-century Dutch women singers